Studies in History of Biology was an annual publication edited by William Coleman and Camille Limoges and published by Johns Hopkins University Press, Baltimore MD, in seven volumes from 1977 to 1984.

Volumes
Vol. 1 (1977) 232 pp. 
Ravin, Arnold R.: The gene as catalyst, the gene as organism. 1-45. 
Albury, William Randall: Experiment and explanation in the physiology of Bichat and Magendie. 47-131. 
Cowan, Ruth Schwartz: Nature and nurture: the interplay of biology and politics in the work of Francis Galton. 133–208. 
Holmes, Frederic L.: Conceptual history: a review of François Jacob, La Logique du Vivant - The Logic of Life. 209–218. 
Vol. 2 (1978) 224 pp. 
Staum, M.S.: Medical components in Cabanis's science of man. 1-31. 
Ospovat, Dov: Perfect adaptation and teleological explanation: approaches to the problem of the history of life in the mid-nineteenth century. 33–56. 
Kottler, D.B.: Louis Pasteur and molecular dissymmetry, 1844–1857. 57–98. 
Todes, Daniel: V.O. Kovalevskii: the genesis, content, and reception of his paleontological work. 99-165. 
Provine, W. B.: The role of mathematical population geneticists in the evolutionary synthesis of the 1930s and 1940s. 167–192. 
Haraway, D.J. & Mocek, R.: Reinterpretation or rehabilitation: an exercise in contemporary Marxist history of science. 193–209. 
Vol. 3 (1979) 297 pp.    - A festschrift for Ernst Mayr on his 75th birthday in 1979.
Burkhardt, Richard W., Jr.: Closing the door on Lord Morton's mare: the rise and fall of telegony. 1-21. 
Sulloway, Frank J.: Geographic isolation in Darwin's thinking: the vicissitudes of a crucial idea. 23–65. 
Coleman, William: Bergmann's Rule: animal heat as a biological phenomenon. 67–88. 
Winsor, Mary Pickard: Louis Agassiz and the species question. 89-117. 
Gould, Stephen Jay: Agassiz's marginalia in Lyell's Principles, or the perils of uniformity and the ambiguity of heroes. 119–138.
Churchill, Frederick B.: Sex and the single organism: biological theories of sexuality in mid-nineteenth century. 139–177. 
Allen, Garland E.: Naturalists and experimentalists: the genotype and the phenotype. 179–209. 
Provine, William B.: Francis B. Sumner and the evolutionary synthesis. 211–240. 
Adams, Mark B.: From "gene fund" to "gene pool": on the evolution of evolutionary language. 241–285. 
Vol. 4 (1980) 206 pp. 
Leys, Ruth: Background to the reflex controversy: William Alison and the doctrine of sympathy before Hall. 1-66. 
Kohn, David: Theories to work by: rejected theories, reproduction and Darwin's path to natural selection. 67-170. 
Cittadino, Eugene: Ecology and the professionalization of botany in America. 171–198.
Vol. 5 (1981) 216 pp. 
Cross, Stephen J.: John Hunter, the animal oeconomy, and late eighteenth-century physiological discourse. 5: 1–110. 
Timothy Lenoir: The Göttingen School and the development of transcendental Naturphilosophie in the Romantic Era. 111–205. 
Vol. 6 (1982) 231 pp. 
Hodge, M.J.S.: Darwin and the laws of the animate part of the terrestrial system (1835-1837): on the Lyellian origins of his zoonomical explanatory program. 1–106.
Maienschein, J.: Experimental biology in transition: Harrison's embryology, 1895–1910. 107–127.
Haraway, Donna: Signs of dominance: from a physiology to a cybernetics of primate society, C.R. Carpenter, 1930–1970. 129–219.
Vol. 7 (1984) 160 pp. 
Eddy, J.H.: Buffon, organic alterations, and man. 1-45. 
Jacyna, L.S.: Principles of general physiology: the comparative dimension of British neuroscience in the 1830s and 1840s. 7: 47–92.

References

Biology, Studies in the History of